Chuluu (stone; inflexions Chuluut or Chuluun) is a common Mongolian geographical name, specifying:

 The Chuluut River.
 several sums (districts) in different Mongolian aimags (provinces):
 Chuluut, Arkhangai
 Chuluunkhoroot, Dornod
 Tsagaanchuluut, Zavkhan